Buena Vista is an independent city located in the Blue Ridge Mountains region of Virginia in the United States. As of the 2020 census, the population was 6,641. The Bureau of Economic Analysis combines the independent cities of Buena Vista and Lexington, along with surrounding Rockbridge County, for statistical purposes.

The city is located approximately 39 miles northwest of Lynchburg and 56 miles northeast of Roanoke.

History
Formerly named Hart's Bottom, Green Forest or Green Valley until 1888, and chartered as a town in 1890, Buena Vista separated politically from surrounding Rockbridge County when granted a city charter on February 15, 1892.

The Buena Vista Downtown Historic District, Buena Vista Colored School, Cedar Hill, Glen Maury, Old Courthouse, Southern Seminary Main Building, and W.N. Seay House are listed on the National Register of Historic Places.

Early history
Founded by Benjamin C. Moomaw in the late 1800s, the town consisted only of a simple tannery at the intersection of two railroads and a canal. The Richmond and Alleghany Railroad and the Shenandoah Valley Railroad, stood alongside the James River Canal that had been used to transport materials from the Atlantic ports of Virginia to Lexington since the 18th century, but by the founding of the city had been converted for the distribution of water power. After opening the tannery, Moomaw opened a pulp mill and a canning factory. In 1882 Appold & Sons Tannery opened, and the first public school opened in 1885.

In 1893, the town was described as "one of the many new towns that seem to have sprung up as if by magic in some parts of Virginia." Previous to 1889 none of the 600 dwellings, churches, stores, hotels and other buildings in the town had been built "but where are streets and all that goes to make a booming city the reapers that year gathered a luxuriant crop of wheat." In December 1888, Moomaw wrote the Buena Vista Prospectus to organize a town and began selling stock. "It took only 30 days for all the stock to be sold for a total of $400,000. With the sale completed, it was time to lay out the town and begin recruiting people and industries." On February 22, 1889, a large deposit of iron ore was reportedly discovered that resulted in a boom of economic activity that lasted until March 4, 1892. In just those three years the community grew extensively, adding a new brick school house, an opera house, two churches, a luxury hotel, a new Masonic Lodge (Buena Vista Lodge No. 186), a paper and pulp mill, a saddle factory, a cashmere mill, two brick and clay works, a wagon works, two banks, an egg crate factory, an electric light plant, a furniture and chair factory, a boiler factory, an iron furnace and steel factory, a glass foundry, and several wood and lumber establishments.

Flooding

Buena Vista is situated on the east side of the Maury River at the western foot of the Blue Ridge Mountains. The Maury has a history of destructive floods damaging nearby communities. Particularly notable were floods on Oct 12, 1870, on the death of Robert E. Lee, when the Maury River provided Lee a temporary coffin due to a dock washed away up river (source: Library Virginia Military Institute), and in 1936, 1969, 1985 and 1995. The Flood of '69 was the result of rainfall from the inland movement of Hurricane Camille. The Flood of '85 resulted from the convergence of three systems, including Hurricane Juan, which dumped tremendous amounts of rain on western Virginia. The difference in flooding results from differing contributions of the South River depending on rainfall in the respective watersheds.

The James C. Olin Flood Control Project was completed in 1997 to reduce the potential for damage from flooding of the Maury River and inland streams in Buena Vista. The project consists of a 2.5-mile levee wall, topped by a walking trail known as the River Walk.

Geography
Buena Vista is located at  (37.734455, -79.354277). It is surrounded by, but separate from, Rockbridge County. The Maury River forms part of the western boundary of Buena Vista, with the city limits crossing the river in one area to encompass Glen Maury Park on the west side.

U.S. Route 60 passes through the north side of Buena Vista, leading northwest  to Lexington and east across the Blue Ridge Mountains  to Amherst. U.S. Route 501 has its northern terminus in the city and leads south  to Lynchburg, passing through the James River gorge.

Demographics

2020 census

Note: the US Census treats Hispanic/Latino as an ethnic category. This table excludes Latinos from the racial categories and assigns them to a separate category. Hispanics/Latinos can be of any race.

2018 Census estimates
Based on Census population estimates and American Community Survey (ACS) estimates for 2018, the population of Buena Vista was 6,237 people, consisting of 2,539 households. 2.6% of the population was under 5, 17.4% were under 18, and 19.5% were 65 and older. The majority of the population were white at 89.9%, followed by Black or African American at 5.5%, and 2.7% were of Hispanic or Latino ethnicity. The median household income was $34,273, and 15.2% of persons were below the poverty line.

Additionally, the Census estimated there were 2,864 housing units in 2018. 66.7% of units were owner-occupied, and the median value of these owner-occupied units was $122,100. The median gross rent was $739.

Education 
Buena Vista is home to Southern Virginia University, which had an enrollment of 1,106 full-time students in the fall of 2019.

The independent Buena Vista City Public School (BVCPS) system serves residents of the City. The enrollment for the 2019-2020 school year was 895 students pre-K through 12. The system's four schools are fully accredited by the Virginia Department of Education.

There are four schools in the system:
F. W. Kling Elementary, serving grades Pre-K through 2
Enderly Heights Elementary, serving grades 3 through 5
Parry McCluer Middle, serving grades 6-7
Parry McCluer High, serving grades 8-12

Media 
Buena Vista is within the Roanoke/Lynchburg media market. Local television news coverage is provided by television stations based in Roanoke, Virginia. The Roanoke Times is Buena Vista's major daily newspaper. Several non-daily print publications are produced locally which cover the Buena Vista, Lexington, and Rockbridge County area as listed below:
The Rockbridge Advocate (monthly magazine)
The News-Gazette (weekly newspaper)
The Rockbridge Report (weekly website and cable broadcast by the students at Washington and Lee University)

Additionally, Buena Vista is the city of license for classic hits-formatted radio station 96.7 3WZ.

Landmarks
Landmarks and historic sites in Buena Vista include the 1890 Buena Vista Hotel (now Main Hall at SVU), original Buena Vista Courthouse (now A.B. Modine Memorial Library), Canton Chinese Restaurant and Glen Maury Park, particularly the two-story wooden pavilion which provides 360 degree views of the surrounding landscape.

Climate
The climate in this area is characterized by hot, humid summers and generally mild to cool winters. According to the Köppen Climate Classification system, Buena Vista has a humid subtropical climate, abbreviated "Cfa" on climate maps.

Notable people
 Major League Baseball World Series champion manager Charlie Manuel of the Philadelphia Phillies was a Buena Vista resident and is a graduate of Parry McCluer High School where he was a multi-sport star. Manuel played in the Major Leagues and Japan during his playing career in the 1960s and 1970s.
 George Wheeler (1948-2002) was a Parry McCluer High School graduate and football player who went on to hold prominent coaching positions including defensive line coach at South Carolina State University, University of Missouri-Columbia and University of Arkansas; defensive line coach for the New Jersey Generals; defensive coordinator at University of Utah; and offensive coordinator at North Carolina A&T University.
 Filmmaker Tracy Lee Staton of Roadkill Entertainment LLC is a Buena Vista resident, and graduate of Hollins College. Tracy produced and directed the movie Terror in Woods Creek, which was filmed in Buena Vista.

Politics

See also
National Register of Historic Places listings in Buena Vista, Virginia

References

External links

City of Buena Vista official website
Buena Vista, Virginia Community News
Lexington-Rockbridge-Buena Vista Tourism

 
Cities in Virginia
1892 establishments in Virginia
Populated places established in 1892